Antônio Luciano da Silva Neto (born 26 April 2004), commonly known as Antônio, is a Brazilian footballer who currently plays as a forward for SC Brasil.

Club career
Antônio made his professional debut for Macaé in the Campeonato Carioca at the age of sixteen.

Career statistics

Club

Notes

References

2004 births
Living people
People from São João de Meriti
Sportspeople from Rio de Janeiro (state)
Brazilian footballers
Association football forwards
Esporte Clube Tigres do Brasil players
Oeste Futebol Clube players
Macaé Esporte Futebol Clube players
Associação Atlética Portuguesa (RJ) players
Grêmio Esportivo Brasil players